Ronald Zothanzama (born 4 May 1992) is an Indian footballer who plays as a defender for Aizawl in the I-League.

Career

Shillong Lajong
Ronald made his professional and I-League debut for Shillong Lajong on 24 March 2012 against Chirag United Club Kerala in which Shillong lost 2–3.

Career statistics

Club
Statistics accurate as of 31 March 2012

References

Indian footballers
1992 births
Living people
I-League players
Footballers from Mizoram
Association football defenders
Shillong Lajong FC players